Kajsa Britta Kling (born 25 December 1988) is a retired World Cup alpine ski racer from Sweden.

Born in Åre, Kling competed in all five alpine disciplines. At the 2010 Winter Olympics, she finished 26th in the giant slalom.  On 28 December 2010, Kling crashed during a giant slalom race in Semmering, Austria, which ended her 2011 season.

On 14 December 2013, Kling attained her first World Cup podium, placing second in a Super-G race in St. Moritz, Switzerland.

Ahead of the 2017/18 season, it was announced that Kling would take a break from World Cup racing because of depression. Kling set no target for a return at the time. In August 2018, Kling announced her decision not to return to the World Cup and retire from active competition.

World Cup results

Season standings

Race podiums
 2 podiums – (1 DH, 1 SG)

World Championship results

Olympic results

References

External links 

Kajsa Kling World Cup standings at the International Ski Federation

Swedish Olympic Committee (SOK) – Kajsa Kling – 
Swedish Alpine Ski Team   
 

1988 births
Living people
People from Åre Municipality
Swedish female alpine skiers
Alpine skiers at the 2010 Winter Olympics
Alpine skiers at the 2014 Winter Olympics
Olympic alpine skiers of Sweden
Sportspeople from Jämtland County